Phaeothamniales is an order of alga in the Ochrophyta.

References

Ochrophyta
Heterokont orders